The Boy in the Sailor Suit is a studio album by Dave Cousins.

Track listing

All songs written by Dave Cousins except where noted

"Never Take Sweets from a Stranger" – (4:41)
"Mellow Moon" – (6:19)
"The Smile You Left Behind" – (3:08)
"Calling Out My Name" – (5:11)
"Mother Luck" – (4:16)
"Wish You were Here" – (5:19)
"Skip to my Lou" (Cousins, Conny Conrad) – (4:50)
"Lonely Days, Lonely Nights" (Cousins, Conrad) – (4:55)
"Bringing in the Harvest" – (4:36)
"Hellfire Blues" – (5:42)

Personnel

Dave Cousins – vocals, acoustic guitar
Miller Anderson – guitar
Ian Cutler – fiddle
Chas Cronk – bass guitar
Chris Hunt – drums

with guests

Elizabeth Tophill – backing vocals
Frances Tophill – backing vocals
Tony Attwood – organ on track 9
Chris Ball – piano on track 10

Recording

Chris Tsangarides – producer, engineer
Chas Cronk – mastering

Recorded at The Ecology Rooms, Kent  – .

Release history

References
The Boy in the Sailor Suit on Strawbsweb
Liner notes to CD WMCD 2040 The Boy in the Sailor Suit

2007 albums
Albums produced by Chris Tsangarides
Dave Cousins albums